The 1988 Vuelta a Andalucía was the 34th edition of the Vuelta a Andalucía cycle race and was held on 2 February to 7 February 1988. The race started in Cádiz and finished in Granada. The race was won by Edwig Van Hooydonck.

General classification

References

Vuelta a Andalucia
Vuelta a Andalucía by year
1988 in Spanish sport